Steeple Barton is a civil parish and scattered settlement on the River Dorn in West Oxfordshire, about  east of Chipping Norton, a similar distance west of Bicester and  south of Banbury. The 2011 Census recorded the parish's population as 1,523. Much of the parish's eastern boundary is formed by the former turnpike between Oxford and Banbury, now classified the A4260 road. The minor road between Middle Barton and Kiddington forms part of the western boundary. Field boundaries form most of the rest of the boundaries of the parish.

Archaeology
Near Barton Lodge are two Hoar Stones that are the remains of Neolithic chamber tombs.

Manor

The Domesday Book of 1086 records that a manor of 10 hides at Barton was one of many English manors under the feudal overlordship of Odo, Bishop of Bayeux. Late in the 12th century Thomas St John had a set of fish ponds made that were fed by the River Dorn. The former manor house at Sesswell's Barton was built in about 1570 for John Dormer and altered for the recusant Ralph Sheldon in 1678–79. The house was remodelled between 1849 and about 1862 to Tudor Revival designs by the architect SS Teulon. In about 1860 it was renamed Barton Abbey on the false assumption that the Augustinian Osney Abbey had a cell here. The house was altered again in either the 1890s or the early years of the 20th century.  

Philip Constable of Everingham, Yorkshire was a Royalist in the English Civil War who was connected with Steeple Barton and was made a baronet in 1642. After the Parliamentarians won the war, they deprived him of all his estates. He died in 1644 and is buried in the south aisle of St Mary's parish church. Like the Sheldons, later members of the Constable family were recusants, including Humphrey Constable who was reported as such in 1663 and 1682 and Michael Constable who was reported in 1706.

Parish church

The Church of England parish church of Saint Mary the Virgin had been built by 1190, by which time it had been given to Osney Abbey. Little of the original building is recognisable except the Norman font. The south aisle was added in the 14th century. Its surviving original features include the south porch and five-bay arcade, both of which are Decorated Gothic. The Perpendicular Gothic west tower was added in the 15th century. The chancel was rebuilt and the nave and south aisle drastically restored in 1850–51 under the direction of the Gothic Revival architect J.C. Buckler.

The tower has a ring of five bells. Richard Keene of Woodstock cast the treble and second bells in 1698. Charles and George Mears of the Whitechapel Bell Foundry cast the remainder including the tenor bell in 1851.  St Mary's Vicarage was designed by SS Teulon and built in 1856.  St Mary's was a dependent chapelry of Sandford St. Martin until the 16th century. In 1960 St Mary's Benefice was merged with that of Westcott Barton, and in 1977 this united benefice was combined with the parishes of Duns Tew and Sandford St Martin. In March 2015 the benefice was merged with that of Over Worton and Nether Worton to form the Benefice of Westcote Barton with Steeple Barton, Duns Tew and Sandford St Martin and Over with Nether Worton, also called the Barton Benefice.

Social and economic history

Anne Greene was born in the parish in 1628 and later became a domestic servant at the manor house in the neighbouring parish of Duns Tew. In 1650 she was convicted of infanticide on apparently doubtful evidence, was hanged at Oxford Castle but survived and was pardoned.  The agricultural lands of Steeple Barton and Westcott Barton were worked as a single unit. An open field system of farming prevailed in the two parishes until an Inclosure Act for their common lands was implemented in 1796.  The main road between Bicester and Enstone traverses the parish east–west. It was turnpiked in 1793, disturnpiked in 1876 and is now classified the B4030 road.

Sport and leisure
Steeple Barton parish has a Non-League football club, Middle Barton F.C., that was founded in 1928. Its home ground is at Middle Barton Sports and Social Club on Worton Road. The parish also has a tennis club, a bowls club  and a drama group.

Notable people
 Anne Greene, scullery maid who survived her own hanging in 1650
 W.G. Hoskins, author of The Making of the English Landscape, lived in Steeple Barton

References

Sources and further reading

External links

Steeple Barton Parish Council
Middle Barton Football Club

Civil parishes in Oxfordshire
Villages in Oxfordshire
West Oxfordshire District